The Paterson Whirlwinds were an American basketball team based in Paterson, New Jersey that was a member of the American Basketball League.

After their first season, the team became known as the Paterson Crescents. During the 1st half of the 1930/31 season, on December 30, 1930, the team dropped out of the league. Owners were Jess Weiner and Jack Summer, both of Paterson, New Jersey. Lou Costello was a player.  Mr. Summer once met with Ed Sullivan, then a sportswriter, for advice on how to promote the team.

Year-by-year

The Paterson Crescents were an American basketball team based in Paterson, New Jersey that was a member of the American Basketball League.

The team was previously known as the Washington Capitols.

Year-by-year

References

T 

Sports in Paterson, New Jersey
Basketball teams in New Jersey

https://www.newspapers.com/image/553721000/?article=5fcd65bb-0e91-4eb5-9093-ae2fd668ab64&focus=0.61335367,0.04092244,0.7272419,0.29731244&xid=3355&_ga=2.76995869.98963169.1610831673-1102443213.1610831673